Liu Zhi (30 June 1892 – 15 January 1971) was a prominent Kuomintang military and political leader in the Republic of China.

Biography
Liu was born into a peasant family in Jiangxi province in 1892. His parents died when he was young and he was raised by his grandfather. He was educated in a local school before traveling to Japan to receive advanced education. When the Japanese government started to expel Chinese students on behalf of the Manchurian imperial government, he returned to China and enrolled in military academies in Wuhan. In 1914 he entered the Baoding Military Academy and after serving in numerous regional armies, Liu joined the faculty of the Whampoa Military Academy in 1924 and became a field commander during the Northern Expedition. He became friends with many important allies of Generalissimo Chiang Kai-shek and they proved to be extremely helpful to his rise in the KMT government.

Rise and fall in the KMT government
He was instrumental in defeating Chiang's rival warlords in the Central Plains War and expanding KMT military power throughout the 1930s by defeating Chinese Communist forces in Henan Province. Chiang Kai-shek rewarded him by appointing him governor of Henan Province and naming a county after him. When the Second Sino-Japanese War broke out, Liu was named deputy commander of the first war zone and commander-in-chief of the 2nd Army Group. By this time, he seemed to have gradually lost his military prowess, and the Imperial Japanese Army easily overwhelmed his forces and broke through the Chinese defensive lines despite being greatly outnumbered. Liu was forced to abandon much of Hebei province in North China and this defeat contributed to the 1938 Yellow River flood, after which he was relieved from his posts by Chiang. When the nationalist government retreated to Chongking, Chiang again named him as commander of the city's air defense. When the Japanese air force started the bombing of Chongking, Liu's leadership was too ineffective to stop Japanese terror raids and raise civilian morale. He was dismissed once again in 1942. 

In February 1945 he became commander-in-chief of the fifth war zone, a post previously held by Li Zongren. When the war with Japan was over, he was named as pacification director of Zhengzhou garrison, controlling first and fifth war zones. When the Campaign of the North China Plain Pocket broke out in the summer of 1946, he failed to destroy the Communist forces (PLA) under Marshal Liu Bocheng and Deng Xiaoping and was relieved of his command yet again. In the fall of 1948, He became the commander-in-chief of the Suppression General Headquarter of Xuzhou Garrison and controlled some 800,000 nationalist soldiers until his capable deputy commander-in-chief Du Yuming was recalled to Manchuria (Northeast) to salvage the nationalist positions there when Marshal Lin Biao launched the Liaoshen Campaign on September 12, 1948. He went into a panic and did not organize an effective defensive line around his command sector when Communist commander Su Yu attacked Xuzhou in the Huaihai Campaign. Although President Chiang Kai-shek again dispatched Lieutenant General Du Yuming to save the situation, Liu's ineffective leadership and timidness had already doomed the KMT position in Central China. When the Communist forces finally defeated the nationalist troops the next year and deputy commander-in-chief Du Yuming was captured, Liu was again fired by Chiang Kai-shek, who was lucky enough to escape Xuzhou via plane.

Exile
Liu first fled to British Hong Kong, and later on made a living in Indonesia as a Chinese language teacher. In 1953, he was ordered to return to Kuomingtang-controlled Taiwan as a political adviser to Chiang Kai-shek. He was decorated with the Order of Blue Sky and White Sun. He died in Taiwan in 1972.

Evaluation
General Liu Zhi's early military career was full of victories and successes, but he lost his aggressiveness in combat skills after the outbreak of the Second Sino-Japanese War. Many of his colleagues called him The Long-legged General or President Chiang's Lucky General to ridicule his battlefield ineffectiveness and acceptance of high positions while many other talented officers were not promoted for heroic deeds.

See also
History of the Republic of China

References
US Naval War College
Ministry of National Defense R.O.C 

Chinese people of World War II
National Revolutionary Army generals from Jiangxi
Politicians of Taiwan
1892 births
1971 deaths
Baoding Military Academy cadets
Recipients of the Order of Blue Sky and White Sun
Politicians from Ji'an
Republic of China politicians from Jiangxi
Taiwanese people from Jiangxi